The TG4 Singer of the Year Award is given annually as part of Gradam Ceoil TG4. The award is to recognise the role of singing in the traditional Irish music world and to ensure the task of  carrying forward the Irish oral tradition into the future.

The following is a list of the recipients of the award.

 2001 – Ciarán Ó Gealbháin, Co. Waterford
 2002 – Len Graham, Co. Antrim
 2003 – Frank Harte, Dublin
 2004 – Rosie Stewart, Co. Fermanagh
 2005 – Maighread Ní Dhomhnaill, Co. Donegal
 2006 – Seán Garvey, Co. Kerry
 2007 – Dara Bán Mac Donnchadha, Galway
 2008 – Iarla Ó Lionáird, Co. Cork
 2009 – Sarah Ann O'Neill, Co. Tyrone
 2010 – Cathal McConnell, Co. Fermanagh
 2011 – Muireann Nic Amhlaoibh, Co. Kerry
 2012 – Nell Ní Chróinín, Co. Cork
 2013 – Séamus Ó Beaglaoich, Co. Kerry
 2014 – Nan Tom Teaimín de Búrca, Co. Galway
 2015 – Roisín White, Co. Down
 2016 – Pól Ó Ceannabháin, Co. Galway
 2017 – Rita Gallagher, Co. Donegal
 2018 – Máire Ní Chéileachair, Co. Cork
 2019 – Thomas McCarthy, London
 2020 - Lillis Ó Laoire, Dún na nGall
 2021 - Niall Hanna, Tyrone
 2022 - Sarah Ghriallais, Muiceanach Idir Dhá Sháile, Conamara.

References

Traditional music
Irish music awards